Valeen Macalalag Vicente (born June 10, 1990) is a Filipino actress, comedienne and model.

Career
Montenegro started her acting career as one of the new talents launched by ABS-CBN's talent management arm Star Magic in 2006. Her first acting role was in a one-episode stint in the comedy fantasy series Da Adventures of Pedro Penduko, playing a younger version of Gloria Romero's character Maria.

In 2007, Montenegro appeared in Ysabella and played a ghost in her first feature film Hide and Seek.

In 2008, she transferred as a non-exclusive talent in the Kapatid Network and was seen on TV5's teen drama series HushHush and sketch comedy show Lokomoko.

In 2015, she moved to GMA-7 after signing an exclusive contract and usually plays either villain or comedic roles in many of the network's teleseryes and is regularly seen on Bubble Gang.

Montenegro appeared on the cover of FHM Philippines''' July 2015 issue. She appeared again on the cover of the magazine's November 2017 issue, this time with her Bubble Gang'' co-stars Kim Domingo, Chariz Solomon, Jackie Rice, Denise Barbacena, Arra San Agustin, Lovely Abella and Arny Ross.

Personal life
Montenegro is the granddaughter of actors Mario Montenegro and Letty Alonzo. Her father, Iñaki Vicente, was a footballer for the Philippine national team.

Montenegro obtained her degree in fashion design and merchandising from De La Salle-College of Saint Benilde in 2013.

Filmography

Television

Film

References

External links
 
 

1990 births
Living people
Filipino people of French descent
Filipino people of Spanish descent
Tagalog people
Filipino film actresses
De La Salle–College of Saint Benilde alumni
Star Magic
Filipina gravure idols
GMA Network personalities
ABS-CBN personalities
TV5 (Philippine TV network) personalities
Filipino television actresses